The northern spotted box turtle (Terrapene nelsoni klauberi ), also commonly known as Klauber's box turtle and Klauber's spotted box turtle, is a species of turtle in the  family Emydidae.

Geographic range
T. n. klauberi is endemic to the Sierra Madre Occidental in Mexico.

Etymology
The subspecific name, klauberi, is in honor of American herpetologist Laurence Monroe Klauber.

References

Further reading
Bogert CM (1943). "A New Box Turtle from Southeastern Sonora, Mexico". American Museum Novitates (1226): 1–7. (Terrapene klauberi, new species).

External links
Terrapene nelsoni klauberi at the Catalogue of Life

Reptiles of Mexico
Terrapene